California Agriculture is a quarterly peer-reviewed, scientific journal reporting news and research on agricultural, natural, and human resources that is published by the University of California Division of Agriculture and Natural Resources. The journal was established in December 1946.

Special issues
California Agriculture often has special issues that explore timely topics, which have recently included biofuels, climate change, and food as medicine.

Awards
California Agriculture has won several awards  from the Association for Communication Excellence in Agriculture, Natural Resources, and Life and Human Sciences (ACE).

Open access
Full text is available for free on the journal's website, which has the complete contents dating back to 1946.

References

External links 
 
 

English-language journals
Open access journals
Agricultural journals
Quarterly journals
Agriculture in California
University of California
Publications established in 1946
1946 establishments in California